The Rock River is a  river in Alger County on the Upper Peninsula of Michigan in the United States. It flows through the Rock River Canyon Wilderness of Hiawatha National Forest, then turns north and flows to Lake Superior at the village of Rock River.

See also
List of rivers of Michigan

References

Michigan  Streamflow Data from the USGS

Rivers of Michigan
Rivers of Alger County, Michigan
Tributaries of Lake Superior